The Halifax Regional Police (HRP) is one of a number of law enforcement agencies operating in the Halifax, Nova Scotia; the other primaries being the Royal Canadian Mounted Police and the Canadian Forces Military Police. The city also is home to a small detachment of the Canadian National Railway Police.

The force has a total strength of 531 sworn officers, 151 civilian staff, 170 crossing guards, nine K-9 dogs and two horses. It is headed by Daniel Kinsella, chief of police. HRP is also responsible for armed security and response at Halifax Stanfield International Airport. A household in the Halifax Regional Municipality typically pays around C$28.39 per month for police services.

History

The Halifax Police Department was officially formed on October 28, 1864, although a system of constables had been operated in an unofficial manner since the first days of settlement, on July 18, 1749.  Each ship arriving in the port city of Halifax would appoint one member of the crew to act as a constable responsible for the actions of the crew and passengers on board. In January 1799, the "night patrol" was formed to address a number of break and enters that hit the area in the previous year.

July 1813, was marked by widespread rioting and the militia were called up to take over policing duties. They were discharged in February 1814, but quickly re-instated less than a month later when rioting resumed.

In October 1864 the day watch and night watch merged to form the Halifax Police Department under City Marshall Garrett Cotter. Six divisions were formed with five men assigned to each sergeant. Halifax got its first detective in 1873.

The Dartmouth Police Department was established in 1874 following the City of Dartmouth's incorporation the previous year. The Dartmouth Police Department worked out of the Dartmouth Town Hall until the 1940s where it was moved to Wentworth Street. In the early 1990s, the Dartmouth force moved to a new headquarters at 21 Mount Hope Avenue. The Dartmouth Police Department had a number of "firsts" for Nova Scotia. Those include, first with winter and summer issued clothing, air conditioned cars, and dress uniforms. The force also was the first to have a K9 unit in the province as well as outfit its members with bullet proof vests. The town of Bedford did not have its own police force until 1982. The Bedford Police Station was located in the current day Cascade Spa building on the Bedford Highway and later relocated to Sunnyside Mall.

With the April 1, 1996, creation of the Halifax Regional Municipality, the police forces of Halifax, Dartmouth and Bedford were dissolved and merged into the new Halifax Regional Police (HRP). Policing in the new municipality was split between HRP covering the boundaries of the former cities of Halifax and Dartmouth and town of Bedford, while the RCMP covered Sackville and rural areas in the rest of the municipality.

Structure

Patrol division
The patrol division is divided up into three divisional areas:
 West - Bedford to Sambro Loop
 Central - Peninsular Halifax
 East - Dartmouth

The patrol division has a special eight-car traffic unit, a park patrol unit, and a mounted unit (consisting of one horse, named “Jewelz”).

In addition to the visible patrol officers, the patrol division has several specialized units:
 Bike unit
 Emergency response team
 K-9 unit
 Mounted unit
 Public safety unit
 Quick response unit
 Liquor Enforcement unit
 Traffic services unit
 Violent crime linkage analysis system (ViCLAS)

Criminal investigation division
The criminal investigation division is made up of four main sections: special investigations (SIS), criminal operations (CROPS), general investigations (GIS) and special enforcement (SES).

Special investigation section
The special investigation section is an integrated unit staffed by HRP officers as well as RCMP officers. This section is responsible for investigating sexual assault, proceeds of crime, financial crime, and homicide. The section also investigates cold cases, and has a high risk enforcement team which monitors high risk offenders in HRM.

Criminal operations section
Within the criminal operations section is a team of quality assurance readers; eight sergeants who are responsible for ensuring the quality of all police reports. The quality assurance readers also determine which section should handle the investigation, if a follow up is necessary.

The investigative call back unit is responsible for contacting people involved in a police incident to ensure that all necessary information has been obtained or given out.

The crime analysis team monitors crime trends in the HRM, allowing police to have a better understanding of crime in the community.

The Crime Stoppers unit is responsible for obtaining information about a crime from the public. Anyone with information about a crime can call anonymously to give police tips that may help with their investigation.

The polygraph unit is responsible for conducting polygraphs during the course of a police investigation, and during the hiring process.

The forensic identification unit is responsible for collecting, preserving and analyzing evidence for police investigations.

The national weapons enforcement support team (NWEST) is a joint unit shared between the RCMP and other police forces throughout the country, including the HRP. They focus on the illegal movement of weapons within Canada.

General investigations section
The general investigations section is an integrated unit of HRP and RCMP officers. They are responsible for investigating all cases of robbery, break and enter and auto theft. This unit also investigates cases of arson, serious assault, and firearms complaints.

Special enforcement section
The special enforcement section is an integrated unit of HRP and RCMP officers.

The drug section is in charge of enforcing the Controlled Drugs and Substances Act. Primary focus is on street and mid-level drug trafficking, and also help with federal drug investigations. Drug awareness is also a priority for this section.

The combined forces intelligence unit is responsible for investigating organized crime. In addition to HRP and RCMP officers, this unit includes members of the Canada Revenue Agency (CRA).

The vice unit investigates crimes of morality, such as gambling, prostitution, and pornography. This unit also investigates missing persons.

The port investigation unit is responsible for patrolling the lakes in HRM. The unit is also partners with the coast guard and the ports harbourmaster to patrol the Halifax Harbour, Bedford Basin, and Northwest Arm. The unit consists of about 20 HRP officers who patrol on jet skis and a Boston Whaler.

The Digital Forensics Unit is responsible for assisting the Fraud and Internet Child Exploitation units in gathering evidence to support their investigations.

Fleet
There are 233 vehicles of which 118 are marked vehicles and 115 are unmarked. These include cruisers, SUVs, vans, 12 motorcycles, four boats, a mobile command vehicle, six ATVs, and a forensics vehicle. The HRP also utilizes five radar trailers, four utility trailers, and a bomb trailer.

Other responsibilities
Since 2011, the Halifax Regional Police are not responsible for bylaw enforcement for the HRM - pesticides, noise, smoking, dangerous and unsightly premises, sidewalk snow and ice removal, and curbside solid waste.

International policing

Three members made history in 1999. They were the first officers from a municipal force from Atlantic Canada to serve on a United Nations peacekeeping force in Kosovo. Since then, 17 other HRP officers have served on peacekeeping missions in East Timor, Kosovo, Sierra Leone, Haiti and Sudan.

References

External links
 
 Nova Scotia Crime Stoppers
 United Nations Work

Government in Halifax, Nova Scotia
Law enforcement agencies of Nova Scotia
1864 establishments in Canada